"Bring Back Your Love to Me" is a song written and recorded by John Hiatt for his 1990 studio album Stolen Moments. The song was also recorded in 1990 by American country music artist Earl Thomas Conley and released as the first single from his Greatest Hits, Volume II compilation album. The song reached number 11 on the Billboard Hot Country Singles & Tracks chart in May 1990.

Chart performance

References

1990 singles
Earl Thomas Conley songs
Songs written by John Hiatt
RCA Records singles
1990 songs